Rocket Gang is a 2022 Indian Hindi-language musical supernatural comedy film directed by Bosco Martis. Produced by Zee Studios, it stars Aditya Seal and Nikita Dutta.

Plot 
The Movie starts with showing a scene of the five main characters driving through a hilly road. They are seen clicking pictures. Amarbir is driving and Tania is beside him with Bunnu, Sahib and Pia in the back. Amar swerves past cars dangerously, and then the scene cuts and we are introduced to the characters. One night when Amar was in his father's store a man named Tony suddenly appears and gives him a poster of a new resort called 'Wonder-villa'. Tony tells him that if he pastes the posters in his store, he will let Amarbir and his friends spend the weekend there for free. Amar shows the poster to his friends, and they decide to take the offer and travel to the resort. There they are welcomed by five kids, Kiara the manager, Montu the security head and room service, Ganesh the head chief, Saher the receptionist and Je Je the entertainment head and room service. The friends find it odd for kids to be working in place of adults but the kids say the resort belongs to their parents and they stay to help them during vacations. The friends settle in and during dinner try to scare the kids with ghost stories. Later Amar and Sahib go to relive themselves in the bushes Amarbir hears a fant lullaby from somewhere but Sahib doesn't, as rain is about to come Sahib goes inside to everyone but Amarbir stays back for a few moments and he sees a dim light from the bushes but after he leaves and a pair of headlines of a vehicle is seen covered with bush while the faint lullaby plays in the background. Inside due to rain and thunder the lights go out, Kiara says the previous guests left a game behind, the kids don't know how to play it as it is too complicated, when the adults see the game is actually a spirit board, they scare the kids a bit more, Pia doesn't think there are ghosts but suddenly the arrow on the board starts moving by itself, it rotates in a circle and when the friends look up they see the kids now looking like ghosts flotation in the air above them, all run away but the kids catch up to them and torture each of them, the adults ask the kids why are they doing this to which they say that because of the 5 friends they are dead,they died in a car accident caused by Amarbir's car, the friends question if they are sure of it, Tony appears in front of them and turns in a ghost, he confirms that it was Amarbir's car which caused the accident because Tony was driving the van with the kids in it. Month tells them their story. The kids who were professional dancers took part in Dance India Dance (DID) they had impressed the judges, they reached the finals along with their rivals the Scorpio academy, the kids really happy reached home, with their dance coach Tony,the kids were greeted at their school by the classmates, principal and mothers ( the kids had taken part in DID for their mothers and dedicated every dance for them, it is also revealed that the lullaby which was heard earlier in the movie is the song the mothers sang to the kids) the kids shared a really close bond with their mothers, few days later they leave with Tony in their group van (with their group name 'Rocket Gang' logo on it) for DID finals on their way they meet with the accident with Amarbir's car they don't hit they the van loses balance and falls down the hill in the Wonder-villa grounds, all the kids and Tony die and get trapped in the villa. After that the ghosts make the friends dance and sing for them, Amarbir hums the melody of the lullaby unknowingly and makes the kids and Tony fall asleep, they take this opportunity and flee the villa grounds, but the ghosts give chase but crash at the gate as they can't leave the property, Amarbir is about to hop in the car but looks back and sees the tearful faces of the kids,he eventually leaves in the car but their faces haunt him and he researchers about the accident and feeling guilty he discusses this with his friends, they all realize how wrong they were and should have acted more cautious, Amarbir comes up with a plan and tells it to everyone. The friends return to the villa and apologize to the ghosts, they suggest that the kids can leave the villa grounds if they possess someone, like Tony had done before to lure the friends, and suggest the kids can still dance and fulfill their dream through their bodies, the ghosts discuss, and agree on the condition that the friends will say their names in front of everyone, then each kids possess an adult each (Montu-Amarbir, Sahir-Tania, Je Je-Saheb,Kiara-Bunnu, and Ganesh-Pia) the kids are overjoyed after leaving the villa grounds, but Tony whose last wish was to help make the kids' dream fulfill goes to heaven, the kids only possess the adults when they need to dance, other times they bond with them except Montu, the friends pass the audition round, Sahir at Tania's home sees how her parents are contemplating if they should let Tania dance,remembers how her mother stood up for her when she wanted to dance, going against her family customs, she encourages Tania to always follow her dreams. One by one the friends move up the sages in DID and the kids help them in different ways to get rid of their hosts' personal enemies, one day Pia sees they were tagged in a post on social media, they realize that 1 whole year had passed since the kids' deaths, all of them go to their school and sees their mothers, the kids try running to their mothers but they just go through them, but the adults invite the parents to see the finals of DID as they are their kids' fans and use the group name 'Rocket Gang' as inspiration, they ask for a hug from the mothers and the kids possess the adults and get to hug their mothers, Sahir's mother feels as if her daughter is hugging her instead of Tania. Later on the kids help Amarbir and Tania to have a romantic dance, during the interview for the finals, the friends don't mention the kids, Montu who was the most adamant until now make his friends realize that the adults don't care about them, the Scorpions invite the friends to a club for battle, there the kids refuse to help the except Sahir, but she also doesn't go against her friends, the adults struggle for a little while, but the kids eventually give in and help them, but Amarbir fractures his arm, which can get them disqualified, Montu not wanting to lose his dream again fixes Amarbir's hand. Before the finals Amarbir and Sahib shows everyone a ray machine which using mirrors make the kids visible, they plan to use it during the finals so that kids get to dance for their mothers one last time, at stage Amarbir confesses everything to the world, they use the ray machine, but it breaks, the kids retreat in the van and cry while holding a cross sign, they plead with God to help them, and let them fulfill their dream, suddenly a light falls on the van, all the lights in the studio go off and when it comes on, the kids along with the adults come on stage, everyone is able to see the kids, they dance on the song 'Duniya hai Maa ke godi mee' they start crying towards the end,with the whole studio, hosts, judges, even their rivals Scorpions, their families. After the dance the kids turn into golden butterflies and finally go to heaven, with their wish of performing for their mothers is fulfilled. In heaven they wait at the gates with an angel (Ranbir Kapoor) and the angel asked them to give him a good rating after going inside, to which the kids say that he has to dance and if not they will not give him a good rating.

Cast 
 Aditya Seal as Amarbir
 Nikita Dutta as Tania
 Jason Tham as Bunnu
 Ranbir Kapoor as an Angel (special appearance in song "Har Bachcha Hai Rocket")
 Mokshda Jailkhani as Pia
 Sahaj Singh as Sahib
 Tejas Varma as JeJe
 Aadvik Mongia as Montu
 Jayshree Gogoi as Saher
 Dipali Borkar as Kiara
 Siddhant Sharma as Ganesh

Production

Casting 
In May 2019, Bosco Martis was confirmed to make his directorial debut with the film. In September 2019, Aditya Seal was confirmed to be cast in the lead role. In August 2020, Nikita Dutta joined the cast as the female lead.

Development 
The announcement of the film was made by Zee Studios in the first week of August 2020 to be directed by Bosco Martis, starring Aditya Seal and Nikita Dutta.

The principal photography of the film was supposed to begin in March 2020, but was pushed to December 2020 due to the COVID-19 pandemic. Most of the scenes were shot in the Konkan and Mumbai, Maharashtra. Filming was completed in September 2021.

Marketing 
A motion poster featuring the logo of the film was released on 9 August 2020. Initially planned for a 2021 release, Rocket Gang was pushed to 2022 due to COVID-19 pandemic. The film was released on 11 November 2022.

Soundtrack 

The music was composed by Amit Trivedi and lyrics were written by Kshitij Patwardhan, Raftaar and Mohd. Talha Siddiqui.

References

External links 

 
 

2022 films
Indian fantasy comedy-drama films
Films postponed due to the COVID-19 pandemic
2020s Hindi-language films